Nigilgia talhouki is a moth in the family Brachodidae. It was described by Alexey Diakonoff in 1984. It is found in Saudi Arabia.

The larvae feed on Ficus pseudosycomorus.

References

Natural History Museum Lepidoptera generic names catalog

Brachodidae
Moths described in 1984